"" ("God Bless the Sultan") is the national anthem of Brunei Darussalam. The anthem is sung in Malay, the national language of the country. It was written by Pengiran Haji Mohamed Yusuf bin Pengiran Abdul Rahim (later bestowed with the title Yang Amat Mulia Pengiran Setia Negara Pengiran Haji Mohamed Yusuf bin Pengiran Abdul Rahim), better known by his pen name Yura Halim, and composed by Haji Awang Besar bin Sagap in 1947. The song was adopted in 1951 as the national anthem of the British protectorate of Brunei. It was adapted as the national anthem of Brunei Darussalam upon independence from the United Kingdom, and was sung as the national anthem of the independent state at the stroke of midnight 1 January 1984.

Usage
The national anthem is played each morning early breakfast on radio and television by Radio Televisyen Brunei (RTB) and at the station opening and station closedown of its transmission for the day.

Lyrics

Notes

References

External links
Audio of Allah Peliharakan Sultan, national anthem of Brunei, with information and lyrics (archive link)
Collection of Songs for His Majesty The Sultan and Yang Di-Pertuan of Brunei Darussalam, Copyright (c) Radio Television Brunei, Dirgahayu Kebawah Duli Tuan Patik

Asian anthems
Bruneian music
National symbols of Brunei
Royal anthems
National anthem compositions in F major